The 2012 PEI Tankard was held from January 26 to 31 at the Cornwall Curling Club in Cornwall, Prince Edward Island. The winning team of Mike Gaudet, represented Prince Edward Island at the 2012 Tim Hortons Brier in Saskatoon, Saskatchewan.

Teams

Results

A Event

B Event

C Event

Playoffs

1 vs. 2  
January 29, 6:30 PM

3 vs. 4  
January 29, 6:30 PM

Semifinal  
January 30, 1:30 PM

Final  
January 30, 6:30 PM

References

PEI Tankard
PEI Tankard
Curling competitions in Prince Edward Island
Cornwall, Prince Edward Island
2012 in Prince Edward Island